"So Many Tears" is a song by American rapper 2Pac from his third studio album, Me Against the World (1995).  It was released on June 13, 1995, as the album's second single. It was produced by Shock G, who used a sample of Stevie Wonder's That Girl,  and is often described as one of the album's best. A music video was made for "So Many Tears" and there were also numerous live performances of this song on Saturday Night Live and on Shakur's House of Blues concert, his last recorded show.

Composition 

The song was produced by Shakur's longtime mentor, Shock G, who produced it using a sample of the song "That Girl" by Stevie Wonder with a slowed down harmonica solo heard during the chorus. The song's lyrics are autobiographical with Rolling Stone's Cheo H. Coker noting the track "finds an almost vulnerable 2Pac not only dealing with the senseless violence that marked his childhood but with the internal demons that threaten to consume him, snapping at his conscience like hellhounds on a bluesman’s trail".

Live performances 

Shakur performed "So Many Tears" during his Saturday Night Live appearance on February 17, 1996. He also performed the song on his House of Blues concert and it is included on the Live at the House of Blues live album.

Charts

Credits
 (T. Shakur, G. Jacobs, R. Walker, E. Baker, S. Wonder; Joshua's Dream/Interscope Pearl Music/Warner-Tamerlane 
 Publishing Corp./ Grand Imperial Thug Music/Pubhowyalike Music, BMI/Triboy Music Publishing/Black Bull 
 Music/Jobete Music Co., ASCAP.)
 Produced by D-Flizno Production Squad for Stayin' Biznizzy Productions
 Engineered by Mike Schlesinger & Tim Nitz
 Recorded and Mixed at Soundcastle Studios
 Background Vocals: Thug Life, Digital Underground (appears courtesy of Tommy Boy Records) & Stretch
 Keyboards: The Piano Man
 Guitar: Eric "Kenya" Baker
 Contains a sample from "That Girl" (Stevie Wonder; Black Bull Music/Jobete Music Co., Inc., ASCAP), as recorded by Stevie Wonder, under license from Motown Records. During the chorus, a slowed-down harmonica solo is heard.

Track listing
Maxi-single
 "So Many Tears"
 "So Many Tears" (Key of Z Remix)
 "So Many Tears" (Reminizim' Remix)
 "Hard to Imagine" by Dramacydal
 "If I Die 2Nite"

Promo single
 "So Many Tears"
 "So Many Tears" (Key of Z Remix)
 "So Many Tears" (Reminizm' Remix)
 "If I Die 2Nite"

References

1994 songs
1995 singles
Tupac Shakur songs
Interscope Records singles
Songs written by Shock G
Songs written by Tupac Shakur
Songs written by Stevie Wonder